The Pyrenean goat breed from the Pyrenees of France and Spain and the Cantabrian Mountains of Spain is used for the production of milk and meat.

Sources
Pyrenean Goat

Goat breeds
Dairy goat breeds
Meat goat breeds
Goat breeds originating in France
Goat breeds originating in Spain